Unee or UNEE may refer to:
 U-Nee (1981–2007), South Korean singer, rapper, dancer and actress
 United North of England Eleven, an itinerant 19th-century cricket team
 Kemerovo International Airport, Kemerovo, Russia